Roha is a town and taluka in the Raigad district of the Maharashtra state of India. It is located 120 km southeast of Mumbai. It is the starting point of Konkan railways and end point of central railways (Mumbai). Many chemical industries have opened up their manufacturing bases in Roha. Roha is located between the banks of the Kundalika River and the hills of Kalasgiri. It has a population of over 20,849. Roha is connected to Mumbai by Panvel-Roha railway line. Roha is also the northern end of the Konkan Railway. Roha is off of the Mumbai Goa Highway, via the Kolad road.

Tourism
Roha is very well known for its Dhavir Temple.  Dhavir Maharaj is the prime deity of Roha. Every year the town celebrates Navaratri by holding a ten-day festival called Dasra at the Dhavir Temple. On the day following Dasra, a palkhi (sedan chair) carrying the statute of Dhavir Maharaj is taken through the town where it visits each house for the aarti. It is presumably, only after Durga, Kolkata, that the palkhi is given government salaami (21-gun salute) with full honours.

Hanuman Tekadi

A beautiful temple of Lord Hanuman is built on a hill (Tekadi). At its top, the full city of Roha can be seen, as well as panoramic views of the city and the sunset. The road to the top is a popular route for morning and evening walks among residents of Roha.

Getaways & Places of Tourist Interest

 Dhavir Temple - Roha
 Bande Ali Sha Dargah - Roha
 Wilder West Adventures, Kolad - 12 km (River Rafting and Adventure Activities)
 Birla Mandir, Salav - 36 km
 Kolaba Fort, Alibag - 48 km
  Murud Janjira Fort - 36 km
  Shri Ballaleshwar Ashtvinayak Temple, Pali - 30 km
 Raigad Fort - 60 km

There are many beaches in the vicinity -
 Murud Beach - 33 km
 Nandgaon Beach - 38 km
 Alibag Beach - 48 km
 Kashid Beach - 50 km
 Kihim Beach - 57 km
 Mandwa Beach - 65 km

Kundalika River 
The Kundalika River is a small river flowing from the Hills of Sahyadri to the Arabian Sea. This river originates at a small town called Bhira in the Indian State of Maharashtra, 150  km southeast of Mumbai. Roha is located on the banks of Kundalika. The river is gaining popularity in recent times due to the rafting opportunities it provides during certain months at Kolad, a place on the National Highway no 17, about 10  km from Roha.

Notable people

 Sir C. D. Deshmukh, was the first Indian Governor of RBI (1943-1949) and Finance Minister of India (1950−56), who spent his childhood in Roha. He was also member of an Indian Civil Service. 
 Pandurang Vaijnath Shastri Athavale was born on 19 October 1920 in the village of Roha. He was an Indian philosopher, spiritual leader, social reformer and Hinduism reformist, who founded the Swadhyay Movement and the Swadhyay Parivar organization.

Fort
Avchitgad:-
The fort is situated near Roha. At the base of this fort is a village called Medha.
The approximate height of this fort is 977 feet[1] It is a fairly easy trek through the jungle up to the fort which takes about an hour to climb.
The great Maratha king Chhatrapati Shivaji is also believed to have reconstructed this fort. The work was carried out in a hurry and hence the name 'Avchit' (hurry) 'gad' (fort).

Industrial setup
Roha has a huge industrial setup. This area is a Chemical Industry Zone as declared by Maharashtra Industrial Development Corporation (MIDC), which was set up in the 1970s is located at Dhatav. Roha Industrial Area has many industrial units. Majority of these are chemical process industries. The late '70s and early '80s saw a major influx of people related to the chemicals industry which gave a unique cosmopolitan nature to Roha which was till then only a farming and trading town. The recession of the early 2000s saw many units being closed down. However, several Industries are still operating.

Some major Industries are:

• 	Albright & Wilson Chemicals India Ltd. 	• 	Kores India Ltd.
• 	Anek Prayog Pvt. Ltd 	                • 	Neelicon Food Dyes & Chemicals Ltd.
• 	Anshul Speciality Molecules Ltd. 	• 	Pepsico India Holdings(P) Ltd.
• 	DRT Anthea Aroma Chemicals          • 	Raptakos Brett & Co. Ltd.
• 	BEC Chemicals Pvt. Ltd. 	        • 	Rathi Dye Chem Ltd.
• 	Calchem Industries (India) Ltd. 	            • 	Roha Dye Chem Pvt. Ltd.
• 	Clariant Chemicals (India) Ltd. 	• 	Sadhana Nitro Chem Ltd.
• 	Deepak Nitrite Ltd. 	                • 	Sempertrans Nirlon Ltd.
• 	Dharamsi Morarji Chemical Company Ltd. 	• 	Sudarshan Chemical Industries Ltd.
• 	Excel Industries Ltd. 	                • 	Taskar Chemicals Pvt. Ltd.
• 	FDC Ltd. 	                        • 	Unichem Laboratories Ltd.
• 	Kisan Irrigation Ltd. 	                •	Iftex Oil & Chemicals Ltd.

Due to dire need of GST, internal audit, stock audit and Income Tax related knowledge in this area for such a big MIDC and industrial setup as well as the ancillary businesses, a branch of authorised Chartered Accountancy Firm called "APMH & Associates LLP" was setup in 2012.

Educational facilities

The major schools in the region are  
Roha Public School,J M Rathi English School, Mehendale High School and K.E.S English Medium School, Anjuman Islam Janjira High School and the gregorian Public School (a branch of St.Mary's Vashi). These schools have several alumni working all over the world.
S.N.D.Arts, commerce, science, college Gove- kolad

Climate
Köppen-Geiger climate classification system classifies its climate as tropical wet and dry (Aw).

Summers are hot and humid with temperatures touching 37-39 degrees Celsius. Rains are pretty heavy during monsoon. Winters are not so chilly with temperatures falling to 11-12 degrees Celsius. Average annual rainfall in Roha is 3450mm.

Transport
Road

Roha is well connected to other cities of state as well as the country. Roha lies off the  National Highway 66. One can reach the highway through Kolad which is 12 km away from Roha.
 
By road, it is 120 km southeast of Mumbai, 146 km west of Pune and 57 km southeast of the district headquarters Alibag.

Bus

The state owned MSRTC buses also connect Roha with Panvel,Mumbai,Borivali,Nashik, Pune,Kolhapur , Tulajapur , shirdi,Alibag ,pune,Aurangabad,Satara, Mahabaleshwar,Mahad of Maharashtra.

Rail

Roha falls under Mumbai Division of Central Railways. Roha railway station is the end point of Central Railways and starting point of Konkan Railways. Many trains run from Roha to Mumbai daily Diva Roha Memu.

Air

The nearest airport Chhatrapati Shivaji Maharaj International Airport, Mumbai is 113 km away from Roha. The under construction Navi Mumbai International Airport in Panvel will be 77 km from Roha.

Water

Although this is not a feasible mode of transport for Rohekars, the way exists. Catamaran/ferry services are available from Mandwa to Gateway of India, Mumbai. Ferry services are also available to Ferry Wharf (Bhau cha dhakka), Mumbai from Revas. Mandwa and Rewas are 65 km and 63 km respectively from Roha.

References

External links 
 "Murud Janjira"
 "Fort Raigad"
 BBC article
 Ghosalgad (The Fort) (just 10 km away from Roha on Murud road via Bhalgaon)

See also 
 Official Facebook Page

Cities and towns in Raigad district
Talukas in Maharashtra